The Alvito Dam is a large earthfill dam in Portugal. The dam was built by Construções A. Supico between 1973 and 1976. It is in the Alvito Municipality within Beja District and impounds the Odivelas River.

References

Sources

Dams in Portugal
Earth-filled dams
Dams completed in 1976